

Klaipėda Lighthouse (Lithuanian: Klaipėdos švyturys) - a lighthouse located in Klaipėda, on the Lithuanian coast of the Baltic Sea; located 500 metres from the coast.

History
The lighthouse in Klaipėda was originally built in 1796, with its first glare shone on September 1, 1796. The lighthouse was the third oldest lighthouse on the coast of the Baltic Sea - with the only two older ones being in Gdańsk and in Travemünde. The original lighting system was made out of six bronze reflectors - however the glare's range was only four kilometres at that time. In 1819 the lighthouse was fitted with a new lighting system made out of thirteen silver-brass plates (used as reflectors) with thirteen kerosene lamps to illuminate the reflectors. The lighthouse was completely destroyed in World War II, it was reconstructed and renovated in 1953.

See also

 List of lighthouses in Lithuania

References

Lighthouses completed in 1953
Resort architecture in Lithuania
Lighthouses in Lithuania
Lighthouses completed in 1796
Buildings and structures in Klaipėda
1796 establishments in the Russian Empire